Metal on Metal is the second studio album by Canadian heavy metal band Anvil, released in 1982.

Reception

In 2005, Metal on Metal was ranked number 441 in Rock Hard magazine's book of The 500 Greatest Rock & Metal Albums of All Time. 

In 2022, Metal on Metal was named #25 of 'The 25 greatest rock guitar albums of 1982' list in Guitar World.

In pop culture
The title song was featured on the November 14, 2010 episode of The Simpsons titled "Lisa Simpson, This Isn't Your Life".

"Tag Team" and "March of the Crabs" were both featured on the soundtrack of the 2009 video game Brütal Legend.

"666" was featured in the 2017 film adaptation of the Stephen King book, It.

Track listing
All songs written and arranged by Anvil.

Personnel
Anvil
Steve "Lips" Kudlow – vocals, guitar
Dave Allison – guitar, lead vocals on "Stop Me"
Ian Dickson – bass
Robb Reiner – drums

Additional musicians
Bess Ross & The Anvilites – backing vocals

Production
Chris Tsangarides – producer, engineer
Andrew Warwick, Joe Primeau – assistant engineers
Ian Cooper – mastering at The Townhouse, London
Dean Motter – art direction and design

Album cover
The album cover, designed by Dean Motter, won the 1983 Juno Award for Best Album Graphics.

References

1982 albums
Anvil (band) albums
Albums produced by Chris Tsangarides
Attic Records albums